Frank Richards a.k.a. Francis Philip Woodruff DCM, MM (June 1883 – August 1961) was a World War I soldier and author. Born in Monmouthshire, he was orphaned at the age of nine, and was then brought up by his aunt and uncle in the Blaina area of the South Wales Valleys in industrial Monmouthshire. The uncle, his mother's twin brother, and surnamed Richards, adopted Frank who then changed his surname. During the 1890s Frank Richards worked as coal miner and joined Royal Welch Fusiliers in 1901, serving in the British Empire forces in British India under the British Raj and Burma from 1902 to 1909, after which he transferred to the reserves.  He is best known as the author of one of the most widely acclaimed memoirs of the Great War to be written by a ranker, Old Soldiers Never Die.

Career 
Richards, an orphan, was brought up by his aunt and uncle in Blaina, Monmouthshire, where, in the 1890s, he worked as a coal miner.  He joined the Royal Welch Fusiliers in April 1901 and served in India and Burma from 1902-09 when, having completed eight years with the colours, he transferred to the Army Reserve for the remaining four years of his twelve year enlistment. He extended his reserve service for a further four years in 1912.

A reservist soldier when war broke out in August 1914, working as a timber assistant, Richards rejoined the 2nd Battalion Royal Welch Fusiliers, in which he remained for the duration of the war. It was while drinking in the bar of the Castle Hotel at Blaina that he heard the news of the outbreak of war.

Remarkably, Richards saw action in virtually all of the major British campaigns on the Western Front without suffering any notable injury. Unable to return to the coal mines following the war because of a physical injury, Richards was obliged to earn his living from numerous temporary jobs.

Fifteen years after the close of the Great War, Richards published in 1933 his classic account of the war from the standpoint of the regular soldier. It differs in many ways from memoirs written by officers who joined the army specifically to serve in the war, and has been called "a brilliant insight into the life of a soldier in the early stages of the twentieth century". Old Soldiers Never Die was written with the unaccredited assistance of fellow Royal Welch Fusilier Robert Graves, who advised on grammar, style and punctuation. It was an instant success and has never been out of print since. Graves and Siegfried Sassoon, another Royal Welch Fusilier, both receive approving mentions in the book, as do other officers. Richards followed up Old Soldiers with another successful memoir, this time of his service in India, Old Soldier Sahib, in 1936.

Richards, who at no point rose above the rank of private during the war, refusing any offer of promotion, was awarded the Distinguished Conduct Medal and Military Medal. He was interviewed by the BBC for their classic multi-part documentary of the conflict, The Great War, in 1954. He enjoyed a drink and a bet and married late in life, to Mary James, having one daughter, Margaret.

Frank Richards, who continued to correspond regularly with Robert Graves, died in 1961 at the age of 78.

DCM, MM and books 

In 1933, he published his memoir Old Soldiers Never Die—with the help of Robert Graves—about his time on the Western Front, where he was awarded the Distinguished Conduct Medal and Military Medal. He always denied any element of bravery in his character, simply saying that he was doing his job. His account of the Christmas Truce was the first to be published by a soldier who was not an officer.

In 1936, he published a second memoir, Old Soldier Sahib, covering his time in the British Army of India. Private Frank Richards aka "Big Dick" features in Captain J. C. Dunn's The War The Infantry Knew 1914-1919.

Books

References

External links
 
 Biography at www.firstworldwar.com
 Spoken account of Christmas Truce at https://www.youtube.com/watch?v=6XAuECyC6gc
 

1883 births
1961 deaths
20th-century British historians
British Army personnel of World War I
People from Blaina
Recipients of the Distinguished Conduct Medal
Recipients of the Military Medal
Royal Welch Fusiliers soldiers
Military personnel from Monmouthshire